HD 47186 c is an extrasolar planet located approximately 123 light years away in the constellation of Canis Major, orbiting the star HD 47186. This planet has a minimum mass of 0.35061 times that of Jupiter, or 1.1712 times that of Saturn. It takes 1353.6 days or 3.7059 years to revolve around the star in about the same eccentricity as the dwarf planet Pluto. This planet orbits at about the same distance from the star as the asteroid Vesta is from the Sun.

References

External links 
 

Canis Major
Exoplanets discovered in 2008
Giant planets
Exoplanets detected by radial velocity